Batriyya (adjective form Batri) is a Muslim sect from Zaidiyyah, some Shia clerics may use this term to refer to any Shiite mixing the allegiance to the Imams and the allegiance to Abu Bakr, Umar and Uthman.

Among those who used the term were Fadil Al-Darbandi, Muhammad Al-Sanad and Yasser Al-Habib.

References

Shia Islamic branches
Islamic terminology